Manatee School for the Arts is a public charter school in Palmetto, Florida enrolling middle school and high school students.

References

External links
 http://www.msfta.org

High schools in Manatee County, Florida
Public high schools in Florida
Public middle schools in Florida